The western larch (Larix occidentalis) is a species of larch native to the mountains of western North America (Pacific Northwest, Inland Northwest); in Canada in southeastern British Columbia and southwestern Alberta, and in the United States in eastern Washington, eastern Oregon, northern Idaho, and western Montana. It is the most productive of the three species of larch native to North America.

Description 
The crown is narrow conic; the main branches are level to upswept, with the side branches often drooping.

The cones are green to reddish purple when immature, turning brown and the scales opening flat or reflexed to release the seeds when mature, four to six months after pollination. The old cones commonly remain on the tree for many years, turning dull gray-black.

Individual specimens can live centuries, even up to a millennium.

Distribution 
Western larch grows almost exclusively in the drainage of the Columbia River, from the east of the Cascade Range to the west of the Continental Divide. It covers the regions from around Kamloops, British Columbia, to Weiser, Idaho, and Central Oregon. It only grows on well-drained soils, unable to thrive on waterlogged ground.

Ecology
Western larch grows more quickly than many associated trees, as it needs to because larch is shade intolerant. With its thick bark, nonflammable foliage and protective cones, the species is very fire resistant. In the late 20th century, after wildfires had been suppressed for almost a century, larches at Seeley Lake and Glacier National Park were endangered by major fires enabled by fuel ladder; normally smaller fires would have depleted the fuel. In more recent years, many smaller fires have been allowed to take their course.

Grouse browse the tree's leaves and buds. The seeds are an important substitute winter food for some birds, notably the pine siskin but also the redpoll, and white-winged crossbill. This is frequently during times when other conifer cones that are a more preferred diet are in short supply. Woodpeckers utilize the heart rot of older specimens to make openings, which are used by various small animals.

Assisted migration 

In 2010, the Government of British Columbia implemented an assisted migration program of western larch to a new habitat in northern British Columbia, about 1000 kilometers north of its current range. Assisted migration of Canadian forests had been proposed as an adaptation measure in response to climate change. Indeed, as average temperatures rise, the optimal climate conditions for trees species are also moving North. Research had shown that western larch trees have no trouble growing in northern BC, an area whose climatic conditions are predicted to match the western larch's historical range by 2030.

British Columbia started seeding western larch trees in northern BC in the early 2010s. This was the first assisted migration program for a North American tree. The western larch was selected for because of its significant commercial importance and the fear that climate change and parasites such as the mountain pine beetle would considerably diminish its supply. To pre-empt opposition from biologists and other groups, the government avoided making public consultation on the program. Instead, they framed the policy as an introduction of a non-exotic species to a similar environment, and implemented the program through the province's existing legal and regulatory framework.

Foresters in the United States have also initiated "experimental treatments" of larch-dominated national forests in Montana. However, if some "aggressively warming climate scenarios" actually unfold, foresters will need to let go of any expectations of helping this species maintain a presence south of the Canadian border.

Uses
Indigenous peoples applied the resinous gum to injuries and chewed it to treat sore throat. Some also ate the cambium and sap; the Kutenai and Salish peoples of Montana in particular collected the sap. A medicinal tea was made from the bark or foliage.
Some Plateau Indian tribes drank an infusion from the young shoots to treat tuberculosis and laryngitis.

The sweetish galactan of the sap can be made into baking powder and medicine. An extract of the tree is sold as a health supplement. The water-soluble arabinogalactan is used in food, medicine, ink, and paint.

The wood is tough and durable, but also flexible in thin strips, and is particularly valued for yacht building; wood used for this must be free of knots, and can only be obtained from old trees that were pruned when young to remove side branches. Small larch poles are widely used for rustic fencing.
The wood is highly prized as firewood in the Pacific Northwest where it is often called "tamarack," although it is a different species than the tamarack larch. The wood burns with a sweet fragrance and a distinctive popping noise.

Western larch is used for the production of Venice turpentine.

Gallery

References

External links 

Larix occidentalis images at the Arnold Arboretum of Harvard University Plant Image Database
Catalog of Life - Conifer Database - Larix occidentalis Nutt.

Trees of the Northwestern United States
Trees of British Columbia
Trees of Alberta
occidentalis
Least concern plants
Deciduous conifers